Andy Ellis (born ), also known by the nickname of "Sniffer", is an English rugby league footballer who last played as a  for the York City Knights in Betfred Championship.

He is formerly of the Featherstone Rovers in the Kingstone Press Championship, and the Wakefield Trinity Wildcats in the Super League competition.

Background

Ellis was born in Derby, Derbyshire, England. He started playing rugby league at 7 years old and signed for Hull KR aged 15.

Career
In 2009 he was named Man of Steel for the Championship and also led the Barrow Raiders to the league title and to the National Rail Cup Final. Ellis was also part of the Championship All Stars team in 2009 after having an incredible season with Barrow.

He has previously played for Wakefield Trinity Wildcats, Hull Kingston Rovers and Harlequins being named players player at Harlequins in 2011.

In September 2012, he left Wakefield and signed a two-year contract with Featherstone Rovers. Ellis later played for Featherstone and became an integral part of the team.

On 14 June 2019, Ellis came out of retirement to fill in after injuries to York's three hookers

References

External links
York City Knights profile
Harlequins Rugby League profile

1984 births
Living people
Barrow Raiders players
English rugby league players
Featherstone Rovers players
London Broncos players
Hull Kingston Rovers players
Rugby league hookers
Rugby league players from Derbyshire
Sportspeople from Derby
Wakefield Trinity players
York City Knights players